Chhattisgarh cricket team is a cricket team from the state of Chhattisgarh, India.

Chhattisgarh began playing in Indian domestic tournaments including the Ranji Trophy from the 2016–17 season. The team is managed by Chhattisgarh State Cricket Sangh which was granted the full-member status by the Board of Control for Cricket in India in February 2016. The team made its first-class cricket debut in Group C of the 2016–17 Ranji Trophy against Tripura on 6 October 2016. They won the match by nine wickets.

History
In 2013/14, Chhattisgarh Under-16 and Under-25 teams finished at the bottom of their respective groups in the Vijay Merchant Trophy's zonal league and CK Nayudu Trophy's plate league, respectively. Their Under-19 team, however, finished third in their group in the Cooch Behar Trophy plate league and missed qualifying for the semi-finals of the lower tier by a whisker.

According to the BCCI regulations, an associate member can be promoted as a full member if the said member is an Associate Member for a continuous period of five cricketing seasons, and such a member satisfies the board that the game in its jurisdiction has reached a standard justifying its participation in the national tournament of Ranji Trophy.

Chhattisgarh gained associate member status in 2008, and was given full membership in February 2016. This meant that Chhattisgarh would participate in the domestic tournaments (Ranji Trophy, Vijay Hazare Trophy and Syed Mushtaq Ali Trophy) from the 2016–17 season. Chhattisgarh will play in the Group C of the Ranji Trophy, taking the number of teams in the group to 10. CSCS secretary Rajesh Dave expects Ashutosh Singh, Harpreet Singh, Jalaj Saxena, Jatin Saxena (all Madhya Pradesh), Abhimanyu Chauhan, Sahil Gupta (both Baroda) and Bhima Rao (Railways) to play for the new Chhattisgarh team, along with India under-19 cricketer Amandeep Khare.

In July 2016, former Mumbai and Vidarbha coach Sulakshan Kulkarni was named as head coach of team. He will remain with the team for three seasons starting from 2016–17 Ranji Trophy. Mohammad Kaif has been appointed as the first captain.

Notable cricketers 
Notable cricketers from the state:

 Harpreet Singh 
 Amandeep Khare 
 Ajay Mandal 
 Abhimanyu Chauhan 
 Rajesh Chauhan

Squad

Updated as on 24 January 2023

Coaching staff

 Head coach: Sulakshan Kulkarni
 Trainer: Prahlad Patil
 Physio: Prasanth Panchada
 video analyst: Chandrashekhar Rao

Home grounds

Chhattisgarh play the majority of their home matches at the Shaheed Veer Narayan Singh International Cricket Stadium.

Other grounds

There are 10 ground in the state that can host first-class games.

References

External links
 MPCA
 Cricinfo's Complete History of the Indian Domestic Competitions
 Academy
 Chhattisgarh at CricketArchive

Cricket in Chhattisgarh
Indian first-class cricket teams
2016 establishments in Chhattisgarh
Cricket clubs established in 2016